Stefan Hasselborg (born 30 April 1949) is a Swedish curler and curling coach.

From 1998 until 2010 he was a national coach of the Swedish Curling Association.

In 1990 he was inducted into the Swedish Curling Hall of Fame.

Personal life
He is from a well-known Swedish curling family; his younger brother is longtime teammate Mikael and Mikael's children are Anna (2018 Winter Olympics champion) and Marcus, and his own daughter Maria is also a curler.

Teams

Record as a coach of national teams

References

External links
 

Living people
1949 births
Swedish male curlers
European curling champions
Swedish curling champions
Swedish curling coaches
21st-century Swedish people